French football club SEC Bastia's 1985–86 season. Finished 20th place in league and relegated to Division 2. Top scorer of the season, including 8 goals in 7 league matches have been Jean-Roch Testa. Was eliminated to Coupe de France end of 32.

Transfers 
In

Out

Squad

Statistics 

Matches

Goals

Division 1

League table

Results summary

Results by round

Matches 
Win (W), Draw (D), Lost (L).

1. 16 July 1985, "Bastia" 2-4 Paris SG, 7,000 (L)
Meyer , Soler 

2. 19 July 1985, Lens 6-0 "Bastia", 12,700 (L)
-

3. 26 July 1985, "Bastia" 0-2 Rennes, 2,448 (L)
-

4. 30 July 1985, Nantes 2-0 "Bastia", 14,957 (L)
-

5. 2 August 1985, "Bastia" 2-1 Toulon, 3,500 (W)
Soler , Furic 

6. 9 August 1985, Sochaux 2-0 "Bastia", 812, (L)
-

7. 16 August 1985, "Bastia" 0-0 AS Monaco, 5,000 (D)
-

8. 24 August 1985, Metz 3-0 "Bastia", 11,626 (L)
-

9. 30 August 1985, "Bastia" 2-0 Strasbourg, 3,500 (W)
Cubaynes 

10. 3 September 1985, "Bastia" 0-0 Auxerre, 1,620 (D)
-

11. 14 September 1985, Toulouse 3-1 "Bastia", 10,315 (L)
Meyer 

12. 21 September 1985, "Bastia" 2-0 Lille, 2,500 (W)
Cubaynes , Soler 

13. 27 September 1985, Bordeaux 2-2 "Bastia", 16,000 (D)
Meyer , Solosna 

14. 5 October 1985, "Bastia" 2-1 Le Havre, 1,517 (W)
Soler 

15. 11 October 1985, Marseille 0-0 "Bastia", 12,031 (D)
-

16. 18 October 1985, "Bastia" 0-0 Laval, 1,049 (D)
-

17. 25 October 1985, Nice 1-0 "Bastia", 10,269 (L)
-

18. 2 November 1985, "Bastia" 3-2 Brest, 2,000 (W)
Soler , Meyer , Cubaynes 

19. 9 November 1985, Nancy 4-1 "Bastia", 4,447 (L)
Testa 

20. 20 November 1985, "Bastia" 0-1 Lens, 1,000 (L)
-

21. 23 November 1985, Rennes 3-1 "Bastia", 6,350 (L)
Testa 

22. 30 November 1985, "Bastia" 2-3 Nantes, 3,200 (L)
Furlan , Pastinelli 

23. 7 December 1985, Toulon 1-1 "Bastia", 5,000 (D)
Testa 

24. 14 December 1985, "Bastia" 0-0 Sochaux, 2,090 (D)
-

25. 21 December 1985, AS Monaco 2-1 "Bastia", 3,028 (L)
Testa 

26. 11 January 1986, "Bastia" 0-0 Metz, 2,700 (D)
-

27. 18 January 1986, Strasbourg 6-1 "Bastia", 6,000 (L)
Testa 

28. 1 February 1986, Auxerre 2-0 "Bastia", 2,500 (L)
-

29. 8 February 1986, "Bastia" 0-2 Toulouse, 1,500, (L)
-

30. 11 March 1986, "Bastia" 0-2 Bordeaux, 1,000 (L)
-

31. 22 February 1986, Lille 2-2 "Bastia", 4,223 (D)
Testa , Furic 

32. 8 March 1986, Le Havre 5-2 "Bastia", 9,950 (L)
Testa , Ottaviani 

33. 15 March 1986, "Bastia" 0-3 Marseille, 1,000 (L)
-

34. 22 March 1986, Laval 1-0 "Bastia", 3,309 (L)
-

35. 4 April 1986, "Bastia" 0-1 Nice, 1,000 (L)
-

36. 11 April 1986, Brest 7-0 "Bastia", 4,000 (L)
-

37. 18 April 1986, "Bastia" 2-2 Nancy, 600 (D)
Biamonte, Nativi 

38. 25 April 1986, Paris SG 3-1 "Bastia", 40,000 (L)
Pilorget

Coupe de France 

End of 64
 Rodez 0-0 (pen. 3-5) Bastia

End of 32
 1. match: Bastia 4-1 Chaumont
 2. match: Chaumont 3-0 Bastia
Bastia 5-5 Chaumont. Chaumont won 5-5 on away goals.

References

External links 
 All information of SEC Bastia 1985-86 season - Corse Football 

SC Bastia seasons
Bastia